William Cornelius Lubenow  (born in Chicago, Illinois in 1939) holds the chair of History at Stockton University. He serves as President of the North American Conference on British Studies, and Chairman of the American Associates Committee of Parliament History. Lubenow is also a member of the Reform Club. His many academic distinctions include: Visiting Fellow of Wolfson College, Cambridge and Fellow of the Royal Historical Society.

Bibliography 
(selected)

Books 
 Politics of Government Growth: Early Victorian Attitudes Towards State Intervention (David & Charles, Newton Abbot, 1971).
 Parliamentary Politics and the Home Rule Crisis: British House of Commons in 1886 (Clarendon Press, Oxford, 1988).
 The Cambridge Apostles, 1820-1914: Liberalism, Imagination, and Friendship in British Intellectual and Professional Life (Cambridge University Press, Cambridge, 1998)
 Liberal Intellectuals and Public Culture in Modern Britain, 1815-1914: Making Words Flesh (Boydell Press, Suffolk, 2010).
 Only Connect: Learned Societies in Nineteenth-Century Britain (Boydell Press, Suffolk, 2015).

Articles 

 The Organization of Knowledge in Victorian Britain (London and Oxford: Oxford University Press for the British Academy, 2005): 357-370
 Religion in the University: Authority, Faith, and Learning [review essay], Minerva, 42, 3 (September 2004): 269-283
 Authority, Honour, and the Strachey Family (1817-1974), Historical Research, 76, no. 194 (November 2003): 512-534

References

External links 
 Who's Who in America
 www.stockton.edu
 www.wolfson.cam.ac.uk 

1939 births
Living people
Writers from Chicago
University of Iowa alumni
21st-century American historians
21st-century American male writers
Stockton University faculty
Fellows of Wolfson College, Cambridge
Fellows of the Royal Historical Society
Historians from Illinois
American male non-fiction writers